The Chengdu GJ-2, also known as Wing Loong 2, is an unmanned aerial vehicle (UAV) capable of remotely controlled or autonomous flight developed by the Chengdu Aircraft Industry Group in the People's Republic of China. Intended for use as a surveillance and aerial reconnaissance and precision strike platform, Chengdu unveiled the concept of Wing Loong II at the Aviation Expo China in Beijing in September 2015. Wing Loong II has long range strike capability with a satellite link.

Development
The prototype of the Wing Loong II was presented for the first time to the public during the Airshow China exhibition, held in Zhuhai from 1–6 November 2016.

Design

The Wing Loong II UAV MALE is an enlarged version of the Wing Loong I with a longer body and wider wing span. It has a slender fuselage, V-tail, and ventral fin. The aircraft features retractable landing gear, including two main wheels under the fuselage and one single wheel under the nose. Each wing has three hardpoints under the wings with the capability of carrying bombs, rockets, or air-to-surface missiles. A satellite communications antenna is situated on the top front surface of the fuselage, offering long range data transmission between the UAV and the ground station.

Comparison

Variants
GJ-2 Chinese military version of Wing Loong II. Distinguished by the lack of winglets. Officially entered service with the PLAAF in November 2018.
Wing Loong II An upgraded variant of the Wing Loong-1, with provisions for up to twelve air-to-surface missiles.
Wing Loong 2H Civilian, communication, emergency response variant, equipped with synthetic aperture radar and optoelectronic pod which is able to relay and amplify telecommunication signals. The Wing Loong 2H debuted in July 2021 when it was deployed to assist with rescue work in Central China's Henan Province after unprecedented heavy rainfall flooding, providing a stable communication signal that can be directly used by normal phones with areas of over 50 square kilometers.
Wing Loong 2D
Wing Loong 2Y
Wing Loong 3 Enlarged Wing Loong 2 with longer range and endurance hours. It's the first model in the Wing Loong series that is capable of deploying air-to-air missiles and reach intercontinental range. The drone was fitted with the PL-10E infrared missile, a sonobuoy launcher, and miniature UAV under its wings at the airshow display.

Operational history
The Wing Loong II was used by the UAE to perform airstrikes against the Government of National Accord (GNA) in the Libyan civil war. The GNA received 12 Bayraktar TB2s in two batches between May and July. At least half of them have been destroyed during Libyan National Army (LNA) airstrikes using Wing Loong IIs; the second batch delivered in July was to replace the losses of the first. As of June 2020, a total of 6 Wing Loong IIs have been reported shot down or lost in Libya, all operated by the LNA. One was allegedly  shot down by a laser: if this was true then it was the first time in history that a laser weapon shot down a combat vehicle.

An investigation led by BBC Africa Eye and BBC Arabic Documentaries revealed that the UAE used Wing Loong II drones to fire Chinese Blue Arrow 7 missiles at a military academy in Libya's capital, Tripoli, in January 2020, killing 26 unarmed cadets. The drone was operated from Libya's Al-Khadim air base which has been under the control of the UAE.

During the 2021 Henan floods, because of the interruption of communication in some areas due to flooding, the Ministry of Emergency Management dispatched its emergency disaster-response Chengdu Wing Loong II (Wing Loong 2H) to the corresponding areas, and carried out nearly 6 hours of ground reconnaissance and communication relay services.

Operators
 — In service with the People's Liberation Army Air Force since 2018, as GJ-2.
 — In service with the Royal Saudi Air Force. Used during the Yemeni Civil War against Houthi militias. 
 — In service with the Libyan Air Force that supported the Haftar's forces during the Second Libyan Civil War. Supplied by the UAE.
 — Used in Boko Haram insurgency.
 — In October 2018, it was announced that Pakistan Aeronautical Complex and Chengdu Aircraft Corporation would jointly produce 48 Wing Loong II UAVs for use by the Pakistan Air Force.
 — Launch customer for Wing Loong II in 2017.
 — 14 units on order.

Specifications

See also

References

Medium-altitude long-endurance unmanned aerial vehicles
Unmanned aerial vehicles of China
V-tail aircraft
Pterodactyl II
Single-engined pusher aircraft
Aircraft first flown in 2017